The 1998 Women's Hockey World Cup was the ninth edition of the Women's Hockey World Cup field hockey tournament. It was held from 20 to 31 May 1998 in Utrecht, Netherlands alongside the men's tournament. Australia won its second world title after defeating Netherlands 3–2 in the final. The tournament was staged on two artificial pitches at the complex of Dutch football club FC Utrecht.

Qualification

Squads

Umpires

Jean Buchanan (RSA)
Peri Buckley (AUS)
Renée Chatas (USA)
Gill Clarke (ENG)
Renée Cohen (NED)
Ute Conen (GER)
Laura Crespo (ARG)
Lyn Farrell (NZL)

Hu Youfang (CHN)
Noami Kato (JPN)
Angela Lario (ESP)
Lee Mi-ok (KOR)
Jane Nockolds (ENG)
Gina Spitaleri (ITA)
Miriam van Gemert (NED)
Kazuko Yasueda (JPN)

Results

Pool A

Pool B

Ninth to twelfth place classification

Crossover

Eleventh and twelfth place

Ninth and tenth place

Fifth to eighth place classification

Crossover

Seventh and eighth place

Fifth and sixth place

First to fourth place classification

Semi-finals

Third and fourth place

Final

Awards

Statistics

Final standings

Goalscorers

References

External links
Official FIH website

 
Women's Hockey World Cup
World Cup
International women's field hockey competitions hosted by the Netherlands
Hockey World Cup
Hockey World Cup
Sports competitions in Utrecht (city)